Carlo Gregorio Verdone (born 17 November 1950) is an Italian actor, screenwriter and film director.

Verdone is best known for his comedic roles in Italian classics, which he also wrote and directed. His career was jumpstarted by his first three successes, Un sacco bello (1980), Bianco, rosso e Verdone (1981) and Borotalco (1982). Since the 1990s, he has been introducing more serious subjects in his work, linked to the excesses of society and the individual's hardships in confronting it; some examples are Maledetto il giorno che t'ho incontrata (1992), Il mio miglior nemico (2006) and Io, loro e Lara (2010).

Early life
Carlo Verdone was born in Rome to Mario Verdone, an important Italian film critic and academic, and studied at the Italian Liceo classico in Rome, having the future actor Christian De Sica as his deskmate. Subsequently, Verdone earned a degree in Modern Literature at Sapienza University of Rome, the same university where his father taught, and a degree in Film Direction at the Centro Sperimentale di Cinematografia. During the 1970s he started a television career highlighting his varied comic style, acting as well in some ads in the Carosello show and he started to introduce his characters on television in 1978 in the popular comedy series "Non Stop".

Movie career
Verdone made his debut as a director in 1980 with the movie Un sacco bello, in which he played three different characters. He used the same formula of the first work in 1981, when he directed Bianco, rosso e Verdone, a funny movie about three different men during election day in Italy. The movie, produced by his mentor Sergio Leone, was a great success in Italy, thanks to his brilliant comic energy and to his odd characters and had the soundtrack composed by Ennio Morricone.

Another great mentor for Verdone was Alberto Sordi, since according to many Verdone is considered his natural heir. Sordi wrote two Verdone films together: Journey with Papà, directed by Sordi, and Troppo forte, directed by Verdone and co-written as well by Sergio Leone.

Carlo Verdone, in a long directing career, has refined very well his style, using very much the typical standard of the commedia all'italiana and paying attention to social themes and to pondering stories. Since the 1990s, he accompanied the comic tones of his work with a less comic register, writing and directing stories more attentive to the issues of modernity, cynicism and the excesses of society. Verdone still maintains a privileged relationship with the canons of the Italian comedy, mixing those canons with a more committed type of movie making.
In 1999 he wrote the book "Fatti Coatti".
In 2005 he took part in the Italian blockbuster romantic comedy named Manuale d'amore, and in the sequels named Manuale d'amore 2 - Capitoli successivi (2007) and Manuale d'amore 3 (2011), both directed by Giovanni Veronesi, while in 2013 he starred in Paolo Sorrentino's The Great Beauty. In 2018 he directed Blessed Madness, that has been written for the first time by the director together with Nicola Guaglianone and the cartoonist and screenwriter Menotti.

Personal life
He has two siblings: Luca, a film director, and Silvia, a film producer and wife of the actor Christian De Sica.

He is a remarkable supporter of football team A.S. Roma.

He was a sympathizer until 1991, the year of its dissolution, of the Italian Socialist Party; he supports the Democratic Party (Italy), while maintaining ideological independence.

Filmography

References

External links
 www.carloverdone.it  — Official Site
 
 
 

1950 births
Living people
Male actors from Rome
Italian male actors
Italian film directors
Italian screenwriters
Italian male screenwriters
Italian television personalities
Centro Sperimentale di Cinematografia alumni
David di Donatello winners
Nastro d'Argento winners
David di Donatello Career Award winners
Ciak d'oro winners
People named in the Panama Papers
Sapienza University of Rome alumni
Italian drummers
People of Campanian descent
People of Tuscan descent